Stephen King's The Shining may refer to:

The Shining (novel)
The Shining (film)
The Shining (miniseries)